Milica Janković (Pozarevac, 23 November 1881 - Niska Banja, 27 June 1939) was a Serbian writer of prose and verse. 
 
Milica Janković is also known under her pseudonym Leposava Mihajlovic. She graduated from high school in Veliko Gradiste and art school of the University of Blegrade in 1906. From 1906, she went on to have a teaching career that lasted for more than three decades. She never married. 
 
Her chief work is Ispovesti ("Confessions"), a collection of modernist short stories. According to a critic, Jankovic's Ispovesti stories  may be compared also with the best of Jovan Ducic's travel letters and the most perfect essays of Bogdan Popovic, Pavle Popovic, Jovan Skerlic, and Slobodan Jovanovic. "Characterized by a clear, lively, flexible style, Ispovesti is undoubtedly the most original Serbian book of 1913. So much love, tenderness and warm understanding of suffering humanity is to be found only in one other place: The Bible."

Works

Books
Ispovesti (1913) 
 Pre sreće (1918) 
 Kaluđer iz Rusije (1919) 
Neznani junaci (1919) 
Čekanje (1920) 
Istinite priče za decu i o deci (1922) 
Priroda i deca. Pripovetke za decu (1922) 
Smrt i život (1922) 
Plava gospođa (1922) 
Dušica (1924) 
Pripovetke za školsku omladinu 1 (1927) 
Pripovetke za školsku omladinu 2 (1929) 
Plavi dobroćudni vali (1929) 
Među zidovima (1932) 
Mutna i krvava (1932) 
Putem (1932) 
Zec i miš. Priče o životinjama (1934) 
Žuta porodica i druge priče (1935) 
LJudi iz skamije (1937)

Articles
Otrgnuti listovi iz dnevnika jedne devojke. Ja i okolina (1909) 
Otrgnuti listovi iz dnevnika jedne devojke. Izlet (1909) 
Otrgnuti listovi iz dnevnika jedne devojke. Biser u blatu. (1909) 
Otrgnuti listovi iz dnevnika jedne devojke. Podvig (1909) 
Otrgnuti listovi iz dnevnika jedne devojke. Da li?... (1909) 
Jeno neposlato pismo (1909) 
Pesma o životu (1910) 
Malo srce. (Iz beležaka nesrećnog čoveka) (1911) 
Bolničarka (1911) 
Nepogoda (1912) 
LJubomora (1912) 
Skice (1912) 
Rat (1912) 
Nikad (1913) 
Prva (1913) 
Nikome ne trebam (1913) 
Događaj (Istina) (1914) 
Ex ponto, Ivo Andrić (1919) 
Moj otac I (1920) 
Moj otac II (1920) 
Redom (prvi deo) (1920) 
Redom (svršetak) (1920) 
Tetka i teča (1920) 
Iz Dubrovnika. Noć na Stradumu. Dom na Jadranu (1921) 
Tuđa pripovetka (1922) 
O - ruk (1922) 
Veliki (1923) 
Bela kobila (1923) 
Opštinska drva (1923) 
Bogdan (1923) 
Deset godina (1924) 
Kate Marćeli (1924) 
Ada Negri (1924) 
Na visinama lepote (1925) 
Jedna lepa proslava (1925) 
Izložba crteža G. G. LJ. Ivanovića i Ž. Nastasijevića (1925) 
Stojan Stević (1925) 
Stojan Stević (2) (1925) 
Stojan Stević (3) (1925) 
Stojan Stević (kraj) (1925) 
Dve lepotice (1926) 
Svetlost i Senka (1926) 
Varijete (1926) 
Anđelija L. Lazarević (1926) 
Gospođa Beta Vukanović (1926) 
Poslednja fioka desno (1927) 
Derište (1927) 
Trovanje (1928) 
Mala Francuskinja (1928) 
Tajna (1929) 
"Roblje zarobljeno" Grigorije Božović (1930) 
Slikarka (1930) 
Umetničke ludorije (1930) 
Salomon Renak: Apolo (1930) 
D. J. Filipović "Kosovski Božuri" (1931) 
Cvećarnica (1931) 
Pesme G. Ž. Milićević (1931) 
Mara Đorđević Malugarska: Vita Đanina i druge pripovetke (1932) 
Krug se širi (1934) 
LJubavi (1934) 
Drina (1935) 
Nehotična izdaja (1937) 
Dečko (1937) 
Osveta (1938) 
Pravda (1938) 
Deca na Lokrumu (1939) 
Ćifte (1939) 
Otkidanja (1940)

Translations
Lav Nikolajevič Tolstoj, Detinjstvo, dečaštvo, mladost (1914) 
P.M. Arcibašev, Osvetnik (1921) 
Mihail Petrovič Arcibašev, Osvetnik (1921)

Reference

Serbian novelists
Serbian women novelists
Serbian translators
Serbian women short story writers
Serbian short story writers
Serbian children's literature
20th-century Serbian people
Writers from Požarevac
1881 births
1939 deaths
20th-century Serbian writers
20th-century Serbian women writers
20th-century translators